"Stronger" is a song by Dutch DJ Sam Feldt featuring American singer Kesha, it was released on 29 January 2021 via Heartfeldt Records. On 2 April 2021, Feldt released the song's club mix version.

Background
Kesha told to EDM.com that the song is about "personal growth". "Stronger" — New beginnings — becoming a powerful person through various challenges. She said: "The tune feels like an expansion of his unmistakable upbeat, summertime sound."

Music video
An accompanying "boxing-themed" music video was directed by Andrew Donoho. The video shows Kesha "facing off with herself in fight to the death", and Feldt plays a judge and announcer, watching on the fight.

Credits and personnel
Credits adapted from AllMusic.

 Sam Feldt – primary artist, producer, programmer, composer
 Adam Friedman – composer
 Kesha – featured artist, composer
 Ryan Lewis – composer
 Dominic Lyttle – composer, producer
 Patrick Martin – composer
 Petey Martin – brass, drums, guitar, keyboards, marimba, moog Synthesizer, percussion, piano, producer, synthesizer, trumpet, vocals
 Pete Nappi – composer
 Joshua Rawlings – composer

Charts

Weekly charts

Year-end charts

Release history

References

2021 singles
2021 songs
Sam Feldt songs
Kesha songs
Songs written by Kesha
Songs written by Ryan Lewis